BTU International, Inc. was set up in 1950 and now is based in North Billerica, Massachusetts. The company focuses on thermal processing equipment for alternative energy and electronics, such as semiconductor packaging, solar cell manufacturing, printed circuit board assembly, and nuclear fuel processing. The Company completes its assembly, systems integration and testing at the facilities in North Billerica, Massachusetts and Shanghai, China.

History 

BTU International, Inc. was founded in 1950 in Cambridge, Massachusetts, producing small ovens for hospital, laboratory and daily use. The company entered the semiconductor market making alloying furnaces in late 1950s. In 1972, BTU moved to Billerica, Massachusetts. The company entered photovoltaics market and shipped its first furnace for solar cells in 1985. In 1989, BTU became a publicly traded company on the NASDAQ. In the early 1990s, BTU began to produce solder reflow related products and convections. It also produced the industry's first lead-free reflow furnace. In 1995, BTU hired its first direct employees in mainland China. The Intellectual Property portfolio of BTU includes over 200 patents and patent applications. In 2003, the Company acquired Sagarus Robotics Corporation of Tempe, Ariz, a provider of advanced, automated systems for the semiconductor packaging, MEMS and sensor markets. In 2006, BTU acquired AtmoPlas Technology and research team from Data Corporation. In the same year the company acquired the product line, trademarks and other related assets of Radiant Technology Corporation (RTC).

Products and services

In the alternative energy market, BTU offers processing equipment for silicon and thin film photovoltaics, MERIDIAN In-line Diffusion system, spray-coating systems, rapid thermal processing furnaces (supported by near infrared heating technology), and walking beam and pusher systems for sintering nuclear fuel. 
In the electronics market, the Company's products are used in solder reflow and curing stages for surface mount applications, such as connecting and sealing integrated circuits in wafer and dies level packaging, such as the PYRAMAX family of convection reflow systems, Flip-chip reflow.

Awards 

In November 2013, BTU International, Inc. won the 2013 Global Technology Award in the category of Soldering Equipment for its new DYNAMO. The product also win the 2013 EM Asia Innovation Award during the NEPCON China event.
In June, 2009, BTU International won the 'Industry Choice' International Solar Technology Award.

References

External links 
 

Defunct semiconductor companies of the United States
Companies based in Billerica, Massachusetts
Companies formerly listed on the Nasdaq
Electronics companies established in 1950
Technology companies disestablished in 2015
2015 disestablishments in Massachusetts
Defunct manufacturing companies based in Massachusetts
American companies established in 1950